In mathematics, the category FdHilb has all finite-dimensional Hilbert spaces for objects and the linear transformations between them as morphisms.

Properties

This category
 is monoidal,
 possesses finite biproducts, and
 is dagger compact.

According to a theorem of Selinger, the category of finite-dimensional Hilbert spaces is complete in the dagger compact category. Many ideas from Hilbert spaces, such as the no-cloning theorem, hold in general for dagger compact categories. See that article for additional details.

References

Monoidal categories
Dagger categories
Hilbert space